Mats Christer Johannes Odell (born 30 April 1947) is a Swedish politician (Christian Democrat). He served as Minister of Communications (Transport) from 1991 to 1994 and as Minister for Financial Markets from 2006 to 2010.

Odell was chairman of the Young Christian Democrats 1975–1981. He is a member of the board of the Christian Democrats since 1988, MP since 1991, and the economics spokesman of the Christian Democrats 1994–2006.

He was parliamentary group leader of his party from 2010 to 2012 and second vice chairman from 2004 to 2012.

References

External links
 Mats Odell at the Christian Democrat
 Mats Odell at the Parliament of Sweden

1947 births
Living people
Members of the Riksdag 1991–1994
Members of the Riksdag 1994–1998
Members of the Riksdag 1998–2002
Members of the Riksdag 2002–2006
Members of the Riksdag 2006–2010
Members of the Riksdag 2010–2014
Members of the Riksdag from the Christian Democrats (Sweden)
Swedish Ministers for Communications